Sceloporus insignis, the Michoacán blackcollar lizard or Coalcoman black-collared lizard, is a species of lizard in the family Phrynosomatidae. It is endemic to Mexico, where it is found in the western Sierra Madre del Sur and adjacent valleys of southern Jalisco, northern Colima, to western Michoacán, between 800 and 2,400 meters elevation.

References

Sceloporus
Fauna of the Sierra Madre del Sur
Endemic reptiles of Mexico
Reptiles described in 1967
Taxa named by Robert G. Webb